The 2007 Champion Hurdle was a horse race held at Cheltenham Racecourse on Tuesday 13 March 2007. It was the 77th running of the Champion Hurdle.

The winner was Bill Hennessy's Sublimity, a seven-year-old gelding trained in Ireland by John Carr and ridden by Philip Carberry. The victory was the first in the race, for owner, trainer and jockey.

Sublimity won at odds of 16/1 by three lengths from the previous season's winner Brave Inca. The field also included Hardy Eustace, the winner of the race in 2004 and 2005. Eight of the ten runners completed the course.

Race details
 Sponsor: Smurfit Kappa
 Purse: £350,000; First prize: £205,272
 Going: Soft
 Distance: 2 miles 110 yards
 Number of runners: 10
 Winner's time: 3m 55.70

Full result

 Abbreviations: nse = nose; nk = neck; hd = head; dist = distance; UR = unseated rider; PU = pulled up

Winner's details
Further details of the winner, Sublimity
 Sex: Gelding
 Foaled: 23 April 2000
 Country: France
 Sire: Selkirk; Dam: Fig Tree Drive (Miswaki)
 Owner: Bill Hennessy
 Breeder: Stratford Place & Watership Down Stud

References

Champion Hurdle
 2007
Champion Hurdle
Champion Hurdle
2000s in Gloucestershire